Catwick is a village and civil parish in the East Riding of Yorkshire, England. It lies on the A1035 road (formerly B1244) from Leven to Hornsea.

The civil parish is formed by the village of Catwick and the hamlet of Little Catwick. According to the 2011 UK Census, Catwick parish had a population of 240, an increase on the 2001 UK Census figure of 215.

Catwick is one of only five Thankful Villages in Yorkshire – those rare places that suffered no fatalities during the First World War. It is also considered "doubly thankful", in that it lost no service personnel during the Second World War.

The church dedicated to St Michael was designated a Grade II* listed building in 1966 and is now recorded in the National Heritage List for England, maintained by Historic England.

In 1823 Catwick was in the Wapentake and Liberty of Holderness. The living of the ecclesiastical parish and St Michael's Church was under the patronage of the King. Population at the time was 190. Occupations included five farmers and a corn miller. Three yeomen resided in the village. A carrier operated between Catwick and Hull and Beverley once a week.

References

External links

Villages in the East Riding of Yorkshire
Civil parishes in the East Riding of Yorkshire